Rileyville is an unincorporated community in Page County, in the U.S. state of Virginia. The notable waterways of the locality are the Shenandoah River and Nelson Run.

Notes

Unincorporated communities in Virginia
Unincorporated communities in Page County, Virginia